Old Wives for New is a 1918 American silent drama film directed by Cecil B. DeMille. Prints of the film survive at the International Museum of Photography and Film at George Eastman House.

Plot
As described in a film magazine, disgusted by the unattractive, slovenly appearance of his wife Sophy (Ashton), Charles Murdock (Dexter) goes on a long hunting trip. He meets Juliet Raeburn (Vidor), falls in love with her, and while telling her of his love, he reveals that he is a married man. Upon his return, his wife flies into a frenzy of jealousy. To forget, he goes out with his business partner Tom Berkeley (Roberts), meets Viola Hastings (Manon), who is being provided for by Berkeley, and another woman of the cafes. Viola shoots Berkeley when she finds him in another woman's bedroom and Juliet Raeburn's name is connected to the scandal by a false report. Murdock, to protect Juliet, goes abroad with another woman. After his wife obtains a divorce, Juliet and Murdock meet in Venice, renew their friendship, and marry.

Cast
 Elliott Dexter as Charles Murdock
 Florence Vidor as Juliet Raeburn
 Sylvia Ashton as Sophy Murdock
 Wanda Hawley as Sophy in Prologue
 Theodore Roberts as Tom Berkeley
 Helen Jerome Eddy as Norma Murdock
 Marcia Manon as Viola Hastings
 Julia Faye as Jessie
 J. Parks Jones as Charley Murdock
 Edna Mae Cooper as Bertha
 Gustav von Seyffertitz as Melville Bladen
 Tully Marshall as Simcox
 Lillian Leighton as Maid
 Mayme Kelso as Housekeeper
 Alice Terry as Saleslady (as Alice Taafe)
 Noah Beery as Doctor (uncredited)
 William Boyd as Extra (uncredited)
 Edythe Chapman as Mrs. Berkeley (uncredited)
 Raymond Hatton as Beautician (uncredited)
 Lloyd Hughes as Reporter (uncredited)
 Charles Ogle as Bit Role (uncredited)
 Guy Oliver as Berkeley's Butler (uncredited)
 Larry Steers as Nightclub Patron (uncredited)
 Madame Sul-Te-Wan as Viola's Maid (uncredited)

Reception
Like many American films of the time, Old Wives for New was subject to cuts by city and state film censorship boards. For example, the Chicago Board of Censors issued an Adults Only permit for the film and cut, in Reel 1, the intertitle "A shrewd sensualist" etc., Reel 3, the two intertitles "With a ribbon and a feather Berkeley pays his debts" and "Suppose he didn't get you the ermine?", the incident of Mrs. Murdock pointing to a place near her in bed, Reel 4, the intertitle "No, I can't forget, I'll take you only to your apartment", all scenes of young woman in man's arms on chair, Reel 5, all scenes of young woman in man's arms on chair, young woman shooting man and all scenes of her on floor after shooting, and the four intertitles "I killed him; he was a beast", "We've got to get him to his hotel", "Hushing it up", and "I won't turn you over to the police yet".

References

External links

allmovie/Old Wives for New
Phillips, David Graham (1908), Old Wives for New; a Novel, New York: D. Appleton and Company, on the Internet Archive

1918 films
1918 drama films
American silent feature films
American black-and-white films
Silent American drama films
Articles containing video clips
Films directed by Cecil B. DeMille
Surviving American silent films
1910s American films
1910s English-language films